is a railway station in the city of Iwata, Shizuoka Prefecture, Japan, operated by Central Japan Railway Company (JR Tōkai). It is also a freight depot for the Japan Freight Railway Company (JR Freight).

Lines
Iwata Station is served by the Tōkaidō Main Line, and is located  245.9 kilometers from the starting point of the line at Tokyo Station.

Station layout
The station has a side platform serving Track 1, which is an infrequently used auxiliary platform, and an island platform serving Track 2 and Track 3. The two platforms are connected by an footbridge. The station building has automated ticket machines, TOICA automated turnstiles and a staffed ticket office.

Platforms

Adjacent stations

|-
!colspan=5|Central Japan Railway Company

History
It was renamed “Iwata Station” on October 10, 1942. The station building was rebuilt in 1915, 1957, and 2000. Regularly scheduled freight service was discontinued on February 26, 1996; however, occasional freight trains operated by the Japan Freight Railway Company stopped at a rail siding at Iwata to service the industrial zone to the east of the station.

A large bus terminal was established at the south exit of the station in 2006.

A statue of the local football club Júbilo Iwata's mascot, Júbilo-kun, modeled on the black-tailed flycatcher, stands prominently in front of the station's north exit. Buses at the stop nearby provide service to the club's stadium, Yamaha Stadium, on game days.

Station numbering was introduced to the section of the Tōkaidō Line operated JR Central in March 2018; Iwata Station was assigned station number CA31.

Passenger statistics
In fiscal 2017, the station was used by an average of 8175 passengers daily (boarding passengers only).

Surrounding area
Iwata City Hall

See also
 List of Railway Stations in Japan

References

Yoshikawa, Fumio. Tokaido-sen 130-nen no ayumi. Grand-Prix Publishing (2002) .

External links

  

Railway stations in Japan opened in 1889
Railway stations in Shizuoka Prefecture
Tōkaidō Main Line
Stations of Central Japan Railway Company
Stations of Japan Freight Railway Company
Iwata, Shizuoka